Girlfriend magazine is an Australian teen girls magazine established in December 1988 by Futura Publications. Since 2020, the magazine has been owned by Are Media.

Girlfriend Model Search
The Girlfriend Model Search is a modelling competition. In past years, the model search has been sponsored by Priceline, Schwarzkopf, CoverGirl and Rimmel London. with selected 2007 national finalists even being appointed as the faces of "Schwarzkopf LIVE Colour" semi-permanent hair colorant products.

Finalists

Girlfriend Fiction
Girlfriend Fiction is a collaboration with Allen & Unwin. There are 20 novels in the series. The novels are written by a variety of authors, who write from a teenage girl's point of view.

Novels
 My Life and Other Catastrophes – Rowena Mohr (February 2008, Allen & Unwin) 
 The Indigo Girls – Penni Russon (February 2008, Allen & Unwin) 
 She's With the Band – Georgia Clark (May 2008, Allen & Unwin) 
 Always Mackenzie – Kate Constable (May 2008, Allen & Unwin) 
 The (Not Quite) Perfect Boyfriend – Lili Wilkinson (August 2008, Allen & Unwin) 
 Step Up and Dance – Thalia Kalkipsakis (August 2008, Allen & Unwin) 
 Sweet Life – Rebecca Lim (November 2008, Allen & Unwin) 
 Cassie – Barry Jonsberg (November 2008, Allen & Unwin) 
 Bookmark Days – Scot Gardner (January 2009, Allen & Unwin) 
 Winter of Grace – Kate Constable (January 2009, Allen & Unwin) 
 Something More – Mo Johnson (April 2009, Allen & Unwin) 
 Big Sky – Melaina Faranda (April 2009, Allen & Unwin) 
  Little Bird – Penni Russon (July 2009, Allen & Unwin) 
 What Supergirl Did Next – Thalia Kalkipsakis (July 2009, Allen & Unwin) 
 Fifteen Love – R. M. Corbet (October 2009, Allen & Unwin) 
 A Letter from Luisa – Rowena Mohr (October 2009, Allen & Unwin) 
 Dear Swoosie – Kate Constable and Penni Russon (January 2010, Allen & Unwin) 
 Thirteen Pearls – Melaina Faranda (April 2010, Allen & Unwin) 
 The Boy/Friend – R. M. Corbet (June 2010, Allen & Unwin) 
 Three Things About Daisy Blue – Kate Gordon (October 2010, Allen & Unwin)

References

External links
 Girlfriend website

1988 establishments in Australia
Are Media
Magazines established in 1988
Mass media in Auckland
Monthly magazines published in Australia
Teen magazines